Nikola Ivanov (2 March 1861, Kalofer – 10 September 1940, Sofia) was a Bulgarian general and a minister of defence of the Kingdom of Bulgaria.

One of the first graduate of the General Staff Military Academy of St Petersburg, he fought as a volunteer during the Russo-Turkish War (1877–1878). Ivanov then became chief of the Headquarters of the Bulgarian Army between 10 May 1894 and 29 November 1896 then minister of war between 29 November 1896 and 30 January 1899. During the First Balkan War, Ivanov lead the Bulgarian Second Army throughout the successful Siege of Adrianople. On 4 July his army was defeated at the Battle of Kilkis–Lachanas during the Second Balkan War, a month later his troops succeeded in halting the oncoming Greek army at the Battle of Kresna Gorge as the catastrophic Second Balkan War came to an end.

Biography
Nikola Ivanov was born on 2 March 1861 in Kalofer. He studied in the Aprilov National High School in Gabrovo and then in the Imperial lyceum Galasaray in Istanbul (1875–1877). He participated in the Russo-Turkish War (1877-1878) as a volunteer. After the war he stayed for a short time in Plovdiv before going to the Military School in Sofia in 1878 which he graduated in the next year. On 22 May 1879 he was promoted to lieutenant. In the same year he was appointed in the Eastern Rumelia militia as a junior officer and served in 1st and 2nd Plovdiv Company. On 9 February 1881 he was promoted to first lieutenant.

He participated in the Unification of Bulgaria. On 9 September 1885 he was promoted to captain and with Order No. 4 was appointed for commander of the Tarnovo-Seymen Detachment on the same day.

Serbo-Bulgarian War
During the Serbo-Bulgarian War in 1885 he worked for the chief of the Central Column of the Western Detachment. He participated in the Battle of Pirot on 14–15 November.

After the war in 1886 he was appointed as Fligel Adjutant of Knyaz Alexander Batenberg and after that as Chief of the Building-Inspection department on the Ministry of Defense. On 1 April 1887 he was promoted to major. In 1888 he was commander of the 10th Infantry Regiment, in 1889 he was chief of staff of the 4th Brigade and in 1890 of the 4th Cavalry Regiment. On 2 August he was promoted to lieutenant colonel. After that he was assistant to the Chief of the Headquarters of the Army (1891–1894) and then Chief of the Headquarters (1894–1896). On 2 August 1895 he was promoted to colonel. Between 17 November and 29 November 1896 he was temporarily in charge of the Ministry of Defense.

Nikola Ivanov was a Minister of Defense in the Government of Konstantin Stoilov (1896–1899), commanded the 4th Preslav Infantry Division (1899–1903) and the 2nd Thracian Infantry Division (1903–1907). On 15 November 1900 he was promoted to major general. From 1907 he was appointed as head of the 2nd Military inspection region.

To celebrate the 25th anniversary of his arrival in Bulgaria, Tsar Ferdinand promoted six major generals to lieutenant general on 2 August 1912, and Ivanov was one of them. This was the first time in the Third Bulgarian Kingdom when that rank was given to active officers.

Balkan Wars
During the First Balkan War, Nikola Ivanov commanded the 2nd Army between September 1912 and July 1913. He was in charge of the siege and capture of Adrianople.

During the Second Balkan War in 1913, the outnumbered 2nd Army led fierce battles against the whole Greek army and had to retreat after the Battle of Kilkis-Lahanas and later stopped and surrounded the Greeks in the Battle of Kresna Gorge. Ivanov was substituted in the command of the 2nd Army in July 1913 and on 7 August after the cease-fire he resigned from the army.

During the First World War, he remained in the reserve. At that time he acted as a public figure and publicist. He was elected for chairman of the club of the reserve officers in Sofia. On 6 May 1936 he was promoted to General of the Infantry.

General Nikola Ivanov died on 10 September 1940 in Sofia.

Bibliography

Awards
Order of Bravery, II grade 2nd class; IV class
Order of St Alexander, I and II grade with brilliants
Order of Military Merit, I grade
 Order of Stara Planina, 1st grade with swords - awarded posthumously on 20 December 2012
Russian Order of St. Anna, 1st and 2nd class with brilliants
Italian Order of the Crown of Italy, Knight Grand Cross
German Order of the Prussian Crown, 1st Class
Austro-Hungarian Order of Franz Joseph, 2nd class
Ottoman Order of the Medjidieh, 1st class
Ottoman Order of Osmanieh, 2nd class
Romanian Order of the Romanian Crown, Grand Officer
Serbian Order of the Cross of Takovo, 1st class
Serbian Order of St. Sava, 1st class

Footnotes

Sources
 
 Недев, С., Командването на българската войска през войните за национално обединение, София, 1993, Военноиздателски комплекс „Св. Георги Победоносец“, с. 68-69
 Списание Съвременна пехота, статия Генерал от пехотата Никола Иванов, София, октомври 1940, Изд. Пехотна инспекция, стр. 44, 45
 Ташев, Ташо (1999). Министрите на България 1879-1999. София: АИ „Проф. Марин Дринов“ / Изд. на МО.  / 

Bulgarian generals
Bulgarian military personnel of the Balkan Wars
People of the Serbo-Bulgarian War
Bulgarian people of the Russo-Turkish War (1877–1878)
Recipients of the Order of Bravery
Recipients of the Order of Military Merit (Bulgaria)
Recipients of the Order of the Cross of Takovo
Grand Crosses of the Order of St. Sava
Recipients of the Order of St. Anna, 1st class
Recipients of the Order of Franz Joseph
Recipients of the Order of the Medjidie, 1st class
Grand Officers of the Order of the Crown (Romania)
People from Kalofer
1861 births
1940 deaths
Defence ministers of Bulgaria